William Byron Hillman is a film director, film producer, screenwriter, actor, and author known for his work on such films as The Photographer (1974), Double Exposure (1982), and Quigley (2003).

Career
According to Hillman, after having attended Oklahoma Military Academy and UCLA School of Theater, Film and Television, he became an assistant to Harold Hecht, whom he met while on a casting call at Universal Studios. He was hired as a production assistant on the 1964 film Wild and Wonderful, wherein he was tasked with grooming and dyeing a number of dogs.

His first acting role was a part in the 1968 film Ice Station Zebra. He made his directorial debut with the 1974 film The Man from Clover Grove, and went on to write, produce and direct such films as The Photographer (which he somewhat remade as Double Exposure) and Quigley.

Partial filmography

Acting roles

References

Further reading

External links
 Official website
 

1940 births
American film directors
American film producers
American male screenwriters
American male film actors
Living people